Ruann Coleman is a South African minimalist sculptor. His work, which consists of materials reclaimed from junkyards or sourced from the environment, has been exhibited in Cape Town, Johannesburg and in Rome, Milan and Torino, Italy

His works involve manipulating both organic and inorganic materials such as wooden twigs, metal and glass to change their context.

Coleman completed his higher education at Stellenbosch University, where he obtained a Master of Fine Arts in 2014. He has presented solo exhibitions in South Africa and Italy and his work is permanently displayed at several museums. He was also recognised by the Stellenbosch Outdoor Sculpture Trust which commissioned him to create a work for the Hiervandaan…./ From Here…/ Ndisuka Public Sculpture Initiative.

References

Living people
1988 births
South African contemporary artists
South African sculptors
People from Johannesburg
People from Stellenbosch
Stellenbosch University alumni
Minimalist artists
White South African people